Super Buddies are a team of comic book superheroes in the DC Comics universe who appear in the six-issue Formerly Known as the Justice League miniseries in 2003, and its 2005 sequel, I Can't Believe It's Not the Justice League (published in JLA Classified). The team is put together by former Justice League bank roller Maxwell Lord as a superhero team "accessible to the common man". The team is considered more or less inept and incapable of being of any help by many (including the actual Justice League). The team was created by writers Keith Giffen and J. M. DeMatteis, and artists Kevin Maguire and Joe Rubinstein.

Giffen, DeMatteis, and Maguire had previously created the tongue-in-cheek Justice League International comic book in the 1990s, and revived a similar style of comedy as that series featured.

Formerly Known as the Justice League
Most of the Super Buddies recruited by Maxwell Lord and his robot sidekick L-Ron are former members of Justice League International when Giffen, DeMatteis, and Maguire worked on the series: Blue Beetle, Booster Gold, Fire, Ralph Dibny (The Elongated Man) and his wife Sue, and Captain Atom. A seventh former member, Captain Marvel, is recruited by L-Ron, but he turns down the offer. His sister, Mary Marvel, joined in his place.

The Super Buddies do not and cannot get along: Blue Beetle and Booster Gold, formerly the self-proclaimed "Abbott and Costello" of the JLI, now find themselves constantly arguing and fruitlessly attempting to prove to one another that they have matured. No one takes Booster or Ralph Dibny seriously, though not without good reason. Fire runs a website, "blazingfire.com", where she makes sensual pictures of herself available for (paid) download, and cannot get along with the polite and innocent Mary Marvel, whom Fire dubs "Mary Poppins". In addition, Fire convinces Sue that Ralph rates as "a four" (out of ten), giving Ralph an inferiority complex as a result. Captain Atom has no idea why he even joined the team, and is constantly tense and frustrated around the others. To top it all off, Maxwell Lord plans to fully exploit his employees' images; he sets their headquarters up in a Queens, New York strip mall storefront, making the team available for contact through a 1-800 number and producing a Super Friends-esque television commercial for the Super Buddies.

This new team successfully defeats the E-Street Bloodsuckers, a gang of Harvard drop-out super-powered hoodlums, thanks to a well-timed slap from Mary. The Super Buddies are then kidnapped during their first team meeting by Roulette, who brainwashes them into serving as gladiators in her intergalactic metahuman arena. Mary Marvel and Captain Atom are pitted against each other, and the mind-controlled Mary nearly beats Atom and Fire to death before she overcomes her programming and the team is released from captivity.

While Beetle and Booster rush a seriously injured (and radioactively leaking) Captain Atom to a hospital, the others find that Manga Khan, L-Ron's former master, has come to Earth to reclaim the robot. Khan offers to trade G'nort, another former JLI member, for possession of L-Ron, but when this offer is refused, and Booster accidentally knocks over several rows of Khan's sentries, Khan declares war on Earth. Only by the intervention of the real Justice League (who have been spying on the Super Buddies all this time in anticipation of such a faux pas) is an intergalactic crisis avoided.

Formerly Known as the Justice League proved a popular miniseries, and won the 2004 Eisner Award for Best Comedy Series.

I Can't Believe It's Not the Justice League

A six-issue sequel to Formerly Known as the Justice League, I Can't Believe It's Not the Justice League, was produced by Giffen, DeMatteis, and Maguire in 2004, but its publication was held off until 2005, after DC's Identity Crisis, in which a pregnant Sue Dibny is killed, had run its course. There is a running gag in the miniseries involving whether or not Sue is pregnant.

I Can't Believe It's Not the Justice League, published in JLA Classified #4–9, finds the Super Buddies settling into their roles as superheroes for hire. The Elongated Man is bragging about Sue allegedly being pregnant, when she is, in fact, not pregnant. Fire and Mary Batson (Mary Marvel's alter ego) become roommates, much to the distaste of Mary's brother Billy Batson (a.k.a. Captain Marvel). Captain Atom has quit the team because of the incident with Mary from the previous miniseries and sued Maxwell Lord, leading him to attempt to recruit both Power Girl and Guy Gardner to join the team. Gardner causes several problems of his own: he is opening a bar next door to the Super Buddies' strip mall headquarters, and he takes delight in sexually harassing Fire, Sue, Power Girl, and Mary Marvel.

While visiting the Justice Society of America headquarters, Booster Gold begins messing around with Doctor Fate's talisman and inadvertently wishes the team to Hell. From the depths of Hell, Fire calls Sue for help (on her cell phone, which is then accidentally destroyed), and Power Girl and Guy Gardner are recruited to follow the team to Hell and save them. While in Hell, the Super Buddies work at a labyrinthine version of Big Belly Burger called "Beelze Burger". The demons use Mary Batson as a hostage, since her magic word — "Shazam!" — does not work in Hell (since the wizard Shazam himself is not present in that plane of existence). Ralph uses his stretching abilities to help foil the demons' plan to torture the Buddies. To the amazement of both Fire and Gardner, the Super Buddies discover Ice, another former JLI member, among the denizens of Hell. Sickened by Fire and Gardner's displays of sorrow, the demons free the group, allowing them to take Ice with them as long as they do not look back on their way out. Fire accidentally looks back, and Ice is snatched back to the afterlife. It is implied that Ice will be sent to Valhalla.

The group makes its way out of Hell, but soon find themselves trapped in an alternate universe populated by a team of sinister versions of themselves and their fellow heroes called the "Power Posse". This team is a group-for-hire who operated out of a strip club owned by a sleazy, or sleazier, version of Maxwell Lord and his moll, a degraded and somewhat dimwitted version of Sue Dibny. The Power Posse consisted of a giant-sized G'nort who began a destructive rampage, sado-masochistic incestuous versions of Captain Marvel (who talked with a lisp) and Mary Marvel, who called herself Mistress Mary, a murderous Ice, now a stripper using the name Tiffany, an even stupider version of Booster working as a bartender, and bouncer Metamorpho. The Fire of this universe had been killed by Tiffany and Sue had divorced Ralph. Doctor Fate finally brings the team back to their correct dimension after they have to do battle with doppelgängers of themselves. Most of the battle takes place on the hairy, insect-infested body of G'nort himself.

Infinite Crisis
It was revealed in the eighty-page one shot Countdown to Infinite Crisis (2005) that Maxwell Lord was in fact Checkmate's latest Black King, and had been collecting information on the Justice League members' weaknesses so that he could annihilate them. Blue Beetle had broken into Lord's secret headquarters and discovered his secret, but was murdered by Lord before he could warn anyone.

In The OMAC Project #5, the remnants of the Super Buddies (Mary Marvel included) are shown trying to avenge the Blue Beetle's murder, with no success.

References
 

2003 in comics
Characters created by Keith Giffen
Comics by J. M. DeMatteis
DC Comics superhero teams
Eisner Award winners for Best Humor Publication
Justice League